Selm Alexander Faulkner (born May 21, 1936) is a Canadian retired professional ice hockey player and was the first National Hockey League (NHL) player from Newfoundland and Labrador. He played in the NHL from 1961 to 1964 with the Toronto Maple Leafs and Detroit Red Wings. The rest of his career, which lasted from 1952 to 1976, was mainly spent in the Newfoundland Senior Hockey League.

Early life
Alex had four hockey-playing brothers, Lindy, George, Seth and Jack, and two sisters (Marie and Elizabeth). His parents were Lester, born in Bishop's Falls, and Olive who was a native of Point Leamington. Lester's mother (Svea) was born in Burträsk, Sweden and his father (William) was born in Sherbrooke, Guysborough County, Nova Scotia. Alex first learned to play hockey with his brothers on the Exploits River in Bishop's Falls. His brother George was the first Newfoundlander to play professional hockey.

Playing career
Before entering the National Hockey League, Alex Faulkner was a star player in Newfoundland for the Conception Bay All Stars or Cee Bees, a team that was, for the most part, formed by his brother George. Faulkner led the league for two seasons in both goals and points.

Faulkner's big break came when the team played an exhibition game in 1960 against a St. John's senior team coached by former Toronto Maple Leafs player Howie Meeker. Meeker recommended Faulkner to Toronto assistant general manager King Clancy.

Faulkner was invited to practice with the Leafs and was offered a contract with the Leafs' American Hockey League farm team, the Rochester Americans. In his second season in Rochester, Faulkner registered 73 points in 65 games. He was called up to the Leafs for one NHL game that season.

Faulkner's chances of landing a regular spot in the Leafs' lineup at centre were limited—the team already had Dave Keon, Red Kelly, Bob Pulford and Billy Harris at that position. The Leafs did not protect Faulkner, and he was claimed by the Detroit Red Wings in the Intra-League Draft on June 4, 1962.

That season, Faulkner found a place in the NHL on the Red Wings' third line with Larry Jeffrey and Bruce MacGregor. In his rookie season, Faulkner scored 10 goals and 20 points in 70 games while playing on the checking line.

It was in the playoffs in 1963, however, that Faulkner stood out. André Pronovost replaced Jeffrey on the line and, in that combination, Faulkner scored 5 goals in 8 playoff games, including three (two game winners) against Chicago's Glenn Hall in the semi-finals. The underdog Red Wings eliminated the favoured Black Hawks to earn a berth in the Stanley Cup finals against Faulkner's former team, the Toronto Maple Leafs.

Faulkner played a pivotal role in Detroit's only win in that series, picking up two goals in the third game, including the game winner.

When Faulkner returned to Newfoundland in the off-season, the province declared "Alex Faulkner Day." Schools were closed for a parade and ceremony hosted by Premier Joey Smallwood, who presented Faulkner with a pair of gold cuff links.

Faulkner returned to Detroit for the 1963–64 season, but a broken hand and ankle-ligament damage limited his season to 30 games. Detroit asked Faulkner to start the 1964–65 season in the minor leagues, but he opted instead to return to Conception Bay for the next two seasons.

When the NHL announced expansion starting with the 1967 season, Faulkner returned to minor professional hockey in the United States with the Red Wings farm teams, the Memphis Wings, and then for three more seasons with the San Diego Gulls.

At the beginning of his fourth season with the Gulls, Faulkner decided to return to Newfoundland, where he finished his career with the St. John's Capitals, retiring after the 1971–72 season.

Faulkner returned home to work in life insurance, and later ran a senior citizens' home in Bishop's Falls. He continued playing amateur hockey well into his 60s and was inducted into the Newfoundland Hall of Fame.

Career achievements

Awards and achievements
 A member of the Grand Falls Junior All-Stars who were awarded the Veitch Memorial Trophy in 1953 as the first all-Newfoundland junior hockey champions.
 Won five all-Newfoundland senior hockey championships including three Herders with the Grand Falls Andcos in 1955, 1956 and 1957 and two Herders with the Conception Bay CeeBees in 1960 and 1965.
 Won two all-Newfoundland senior 'B' hockey championships with the Grand Falls Senior Bees in 1956 and 1957.
 In December 1961, he played a game with the Toronto Maple Leafs to become the first Newfoundland-born player to play in the National Hockey League.
 Inducted into the Newfoundland and Labrador Hockey Hall of Fame in 1994.

Career statistics

Regular season and playoffs

References

External links
 

1936 births
Living people
Canadian ice hockey centres
Cincinnati Wings players
Detroit Red Wings players
Ice hockey people from Newfoundland and Labrador
Memphis Wings players
People from Bishop's Falls
Pittsburgh Hornets players
Rochester Americans players
San Diego Gulls (WHL) players
Toronto Maple Leafs players